Park Sangsoon (born 1962 in Seoul) is a Korean poet.

He has published the collections of poetry: 6 is Tree, 7 is Dolphin; Marana, Heroine of a Porn Comic; Love Adagio; Passing the Cotton Field, a Boy Went Away. He is the recipient of the Contemporary Poets Group Award (1996), Contemporary Literature (Hyundae Munhak) Award (2006), and the Hyundae Poetry Award (2013).

Park Sangsoon studied fine art painting at Seoul National University. He made his debut in 1991, publishing 8 poems including “Railway to the Bread Factory” in the spring issue of the quarterly Writer’s World. He has worked as editor-in-chief of a literary magazine and a publishing company.

References

20th-century South Korean poets
21st-century South Korean poets
South Korean male poets
Living people
1962 births
20th-century male writers
21st-century male writers